The Brighton Belle mural is a series of three painted panels set into the arches of the forecourt of Brighton station, on Trafalgar Street, Brighton. The mural depicts a full-size view of one of the carriages of the Brighton Belle Pullman electric train waiting to depart Brighton Station.

The mural is designed to show a view of the train as seen through the arches, and occupies three of the four arches occupied by Brighton Toy and Model Museum. Laurence Olivier, the leading actor of his day and a regular traveller on the train, is pictured at one of the carriage windows.

It is within sight of another well-known Brighton mural, Banksy's Kissing Policemen.

Unveiling
The mural's official unveiling was part of the advance publicity for the relaunch of the restored Brighton Belle train, now expected in 2015.

The mural was designed by Chris Littledale and painted by Terry Smith, and unveiled on 23 September 2010 by the Mayor of Brighton, Geoffrey Wells, and Sir William McAlpine, with the top of Trafalgar Street being closed for the ceremony.

References
 Launch of the atmospheric Pullman Wall Mural painting (visitbrighton.com)  
 A Successful Night of New Beginnings (Brighton Toy and Model Museum Newsletter Feb 2011, p5) (.pdf)
  Spectacular Brighton Belle mural at Brighton Station!  7 April 2010  (brightonbelle.com) 
 ‘Brighton Belle’ return to home station! (Heritage Railway Magazine)
 Brighton Belle mural, pictures (vintagebrighton.com)

Murals in the United Kingdom
Brighton
2010s murals
2010 paintings
Trains in art